Hedwig Courths-Mahler, née Ernestine Friederike Elisabeth Mahler (February 18, 1867 in Nebra (Unstrut) – November 26, 1950 in Rottach-Egern, Bavaria) was a German writer of formula fiction romantic novels. She used the pseudonyms Relham, H. Brand, Gonda Haack, Rose Bernd.

Hedwig Courths-Mahler's novels generally follow a single pattern: socially disadvantaged characters overcome class differences through love. The lovers fight against all kinds of intrigues and are finally joined as a couple, gaining wealth and a high standing. Despite Courths-Mahler's traditional perspective on male-female relationships and the unrelenting criticism of the clichés in her oeuvre, her books still enjoy a broad, largely female, readership. To this day, her novels see regular reprints in dime novel format by the genre fiction publisher Bastei Lübbe, making her the most popular female German writer by number of sold copies. It is estimated that by the time of her death in 1950, 80 million copies of her works had been sold. Throughout the 1970s, five of her novels were adapted as telemovies, made by and shown on Süddeutscher Rundfunk. Only one of her novels, Die Perlenschnur (1927), has been translated into English as The String of Pearls (Philadelphia: J. B. Lippincott, 1929).

Literary works 
 Die wilde Ursula (novel, 1912)
 Die Bettelprinzeß (novel, 1914)
Der tolle Hassberg (1916)
 Griseldis (novel, 1916)
 Ich will (novel, 1916)
 Meine Käthe (novel, 1917)
 Eine ungeliebte Frau (novel, 1918)
 Die schöne Unbekannte (novel, 1918)
 Der Scheingemahl (novel, 1919)
 Das stille Weh (1919)
 Was Gott zusammenfügt (novel)
 Die Flucht vor der Ehe (novel, 1934)
 Die verstossene Tochter

Films 
 Das stille Weh (1919)
 You Are the Life (1921)
 Your Brother's Wife (1921)
 Liebe und Ehe (1923)
 Lena Warnstetten (1925)
 Die Bettelprinzeß (1974, TV film)
  (1974, TV film)
 Die Kriegsbraut (1974, TV film)
 Der Scheingemahl (1974, TV film)
 Eine ungeliebte Frau (1974, TV film)
 Durch Liebe erlöst (2005, TV film)

References

External links 

 
 Hedwig Courths-Mahler beim LeMO
 Zentral- und Landesbibliothek Berlin

1867 births
1950 deaths
People from Nebra (Unstrut)
People from the Province of Saxony
German women novelists
Writers from Saxony-Anhalt
20th-century German novelists
German women screenwriters
20th-century German women writers
Dime novelists
Film people from Saxony-Anhalt
20th-century German screenwriters
Women romantic fiction writers